The black-chinned weaver (Ploceus nigrimentus) is a species of bird in the family Ploceidae.

It is found in the Bailundu Highlands of western Angola, on the Batéké Plateau in Republic of the Congo, and in eastern Gabon.

References

External links
 Black-chinned weaver -  Species text in Weaver Watch.

Ploceus
Birds of Central Africa
Birds described in 1904
Taxonomy articles created by Polbot